is a 2001 Japanese historical film based on the kabuki tale of the Forty-seven Ronin. The film was made for the Fuji TV Network and was directed by Shunsaku Kawamo.

The story tells the true story of Asano Naganori who attacked Lord Kira Kozenosuke with his sword in the Edo Castle after Kira had coaxed the young lord in the late 18th century. Even though the wound was only superficial, Asano was ordered to commit suicide. The 47 Asano Ronin (former retainers of Asano) led by Oishi Kuranosuke (Asano's chief adviser) came back to revenge their fallen lord against Lord Kira and were victorious but the Ronin were ordered to commit seppuku later by the Tokugawa Shogunate.

The tale of the 47 ronin is a popular story in Japan and has become part of popular culture. References to the ronin can also be found in the recent movie Hana yori mo naho with Junichi Okada and Asano Tadanobu.

Cast 
Takuya Kimura as Yasube Horibe
Kōichi Satō as Kuranosuke Oishi
Eri Fukatsu as Hori Horibe
Naoki Sugiura as Yahyoe Horibe
Satomi Kobayashi as Riku Oishi
Takako Matsu as Aguri (later Yozeiin)
Yasuko Matsuyuki as Fujimi
Junichi Okada as Chikara Oishi
Masahiko Tsugawa as Kozukenosuke Kira
Satoshi Tsumabuki as Gunbe Takada
Shin'ichi Tsutsumi as Asano Takumi-no-kami Naganori
Machiko Washio
 Katsutoshi Arata as Hara Soemon
Hiroyuki Ikeuchi
Shigeru Kōyama
Yoshinori Okada
Ken Watanabe (cameo)

References 

2001 films
Samurai films
Jidaigeki films
Films with screenplays by Yumiko Inoue
2000s Japanese films